The Raleigh mayoral election of 1995 was held on October 12, 1995, to elect a Mayor of Raleigh, North Carolina. The election was non-partisan. It was won by Tom Fetzer, who stayed incumbent after beating Mary Nooe. Mary Nooe had been on the city council for 8 years prior to the election.

Results

References

1995
Raleigh
1995 North Carolina elections
October 1995 events in the United States